Spec E30 is a class of racing cars used in National Auto Sport Association (NASA) road racing events.

Concept 

The goal for Spec E30 is to create high levels of competition among similarly prepared BMW E30 3 Series cars at a reasonable cost. It is intended to encourage low-cost, entry-level, production car based competition. It has been called "the next big thing" in club-level racing by Grassroots Motorsports Magazine.

Cars 

The series consists of U.S.-spec BMW E30 325i coupes and sedans, sold between 1987 and 1991. All cars in the series use the BMW M20B25 engine.  Convertibles built to series specs and with log books issued prior to November 1, 2011 are still allowed to compete, but this model has been sunsetted out of the series.

As a "specified" class, the rules allow for a limited number of modifications, predominantly involving required suspension parts.

Required components include:

 M20B25 
 Getrag 260 5-speed transmission
 3.73 Rear differential final drive ratio
 Stock/unmodified ECU 
 H&R Race spring set
 Bilstein Sport shocks
 Spec series tire (which is currently the Toyo RR or RA1 in 205/50/15 size)
 Minimum weight with driver at the end of the race is 2700 pounds

Allowed modifications include rebuilding of the original BMW motor, but it must follow factory specifications.  And even then, there is now a reward weight system that is used based on the actual output from a sanctioned dynamometer (maximum class allowed is 162.9).  As well, a model dyno plot is used to compare all competitors engine output for distinct anomalies.

Series Winners

National

Regional 
 2017 Northern California: Sylas Montgomery
 2006 Mid Atlantic: Chris Cobetto
 2005 Mid Atlantic: Carter Hunt

External links 
 Official Site
Spec E30 rules (PDF)
Grassroots Motorsports Spec E30 project car

References 

BMW
Touring car racing series
One-make series